Ptychoptera is a genus of phantom crane flies in the family Ptychopteridae. There are at least 70 described species in Ptychoptera.

Species
These 76 species belong to the genus Ptychoptera:

 Ptychoptera africana Alexander, 1920 c g
 Ptychoptera agnes Krzeminski & Zwick, 1993 c g
 Ptychoptera albimana (Fabricius, 1787) c g
 Ptychoptera alexanderi Hancock, Marcos-Garcia & Rotheray, 2006 c g
 Ptychoptera alina Krzeminski & Zwick, 1993 c g
 Ptychoptera annandalei Brunetti, 1918 c g
 Ptychoptera bannaensis g
 Ptychoptera bellula Alexander, 1937 c g
 Ptychoptera byersi Alexander, 1966 i c g
 Ptychoptera camerounensis Alexander, 1921 c g
 Ptychoptera capensis Alexander, 1917 c g
 Ptychoptera chalybeata Alexander, 1956 c g
 Ptychoptera clitellaria Alexander, 1935 c g
 Ptychoptera coloradensis Alexander, 1937 i c g
 Ptychoptera contaminata (Linnaeus, 1758) c g
 Ptychoptera daimio Alexander, 1921 c g
 Ptychoptera deleta Novak, 1877 g
 Ptychoptera delmastroi Zwick & Stary, 2002 c g
 Ptychoptera distincta Brunetti, 1911 c g
 Ptychoptera formosensis Alexander, 1924 c g
 Ptychoptera garhwalensis Alexander, 1959 c g
 Ptychoptera gutianshana Yang & Chen, 1995 c g
 Ptychoptera handlirschi (Czizek, 1919) c g
 Ptychoptera helena (Peus, 1958) c g
 Ptychoptera hugoi Tjeder, 1968 c g
 Ptychoptera ichitai Nakamura & Saigusa, 2009 c g
 Ptychoptera ichneumonoidea Alexander, 1946 c g
 Ptychoptera japonica Alexander, 1913 c g
 Ptychoptera javensis Alexander, 1937 c g
 Ptychoptera kosiensis Stuckenberg, 1983 c g
 Ptychoptera kyushuensis Nakamura & Saigusa, 2009 c g
 Ptychoptera lacustris Meigen, 1830 c g
 Ptychoptera lenis Osten Sacken, 1877 c g
 Ptychoptera lenta (Harris, 1776) c g
 Ptychoptera lii g
 Ptychoptera longicauda (Tonnoir, 1919) c g
 Ptychoptera longwangshana Yang & Chen, 1998 c g
 Ptychoptera lushuiensis g
 Ptychoptera madagascariensis Alexander, 1937 c g
 Ptychoptera malaisei Alexander, 1946 c g
 Ptychoptera matongoensis Alexander, 1958 c g
 Ptychoptera metallica Walker, 1848 i c g
 Ptychoptera minor Alexander, 1920 i c g
 Ptychoptera minuta Tonnoir, 1919 c g
 Ptychoptera monoensis Alexander, 1947 i c g
 Ptychoptera obscura (Peus, 1958) c g
 Ptychoptera osccola Alexander, 1959 i g
 Ptychoptera osceola Alexander, 1959 c g
 Ptychoptera pallidicostalis Nakamura & Saigusa, 2009 c g
 Ptychoptera paludosa Meigen, 1804 c g
 Ptychoptera pauliani Alexander, 1957 c g
 Ptychoptera pectinata Macquart, 1834 c g
 Ptychoptera pendula Alexander, 1937 i c g
 Ptychoptera perbona Alexander, 1946 c g
 Ptychoptera persimilis Alexander, 1947 c g
 Ptychoptera peusi Joost, 1974 c g
 Ptychoptera praescutellaris Alexander, 1946 c g
 Ptychoptera qinggouensis g
 Ptychoptera quadrifasciata Say, 1824 i c g b
 Ptychoptera ressli Theischinger, 1978 c g
 Ptychoptera robinsoni Alexander, 1957 c g
 Ptychoptera sculleni Alexander, 1943 i c g b
 Ptychoptera scutellaris Meigen, 1818 c g
 Ptychoptera sikkimensis Alexander, 1965 c g
 Ptychoptera silvicola Zwyrtek & Rozkosny, 1967 c g
 Ptychoptera subscutellaris Alexander, 1921 c g
 Ptychoptera sumatrensis Alexander, 1936 c g
 Ptychoptera surcoufi (Seguy, 1925) c g
 Ptychoptera takeuchii Tokunaga, 1938 c g
 Ptychoptera tibialis Brunetti, 1911 c g
 Ptychoptera townesi Alexander, 1943 i c g b
 Ptychoptera uelensis Alexander, 1928 c g
 Ptychoptera uta Alexander, 1947 i c g
 Ptychoptera wangae g
 Ptychoptera yamato Nakamura & Saigusa, 2009 c g
 Ptychoptera yasumatsui Tokunaga, 1939 c g

Data sources: i = ITIS, c = Catalogue of Life, g = GBIF, b = Bugguide.net

References

Further reading

External links

 

Ptychopteridae
Articles created by Qbugbot
Nematocera genera